is a Japanese manga series written and illustrated by Hiroaki Samura. The series is set in Japan during the mid-Tokugawa Shogunate period and follows the cursed samurai Manji, who has to kill 1,000 evil men in order to regain his mortality. The manga was originally published in Kodansha's Monthly Afternoon from June 1993 to December 2012 and compiled into thirty tankōbon volumes.

A 2008 anime television series adaptation was produced by Bee Train. Also in 2008, the novel Blade of the Immortal: Legend of the Sword Demon was released in Japan by Kodansha. A live action film adaptation of the same name was released in April 2017. A second anime adaptation by Liden Films was broadcast from October 2019 to March 2020. In North America, the manga has been published by Dark Horse Comics. The first anime series was licensed by Media Blasters. The second anime series is licensed by Amazon Prime Video.

In 1997, Blade of the Immortal received the Excellence Award at the first Japan Media Arts Festival.

Plot

Blade of the Immortal follows the deeds of Manji, a skilled rōnin who has a decisive advantage: no wound can kill him, except for a rare poison. In the past, his criminal actions led to the death of 100 other samurai (including his sister's husband). He becomes immortal at the hand of an 800-year-old nun named Yaobikuni, and is compelled by the death of his sister to accept the quest that will end his agelessness. They work by sacrificing themselves to seal the wound - they are worms that were bred to be as close in chemical and physical make-up to humans as possible without actually being human. They cannot handle regrowth on a large scale, but, for example, can reattach a severed limb or seal a hole in the brain.

Manji crosses paths with a young girl named Rin Asano and promises to help her avenge her parents, who were killed by a cadre of master swordsmen led by Anotsu Kagehisa. Anotsu killed Rin's father and his entire dōjō, making them a family of outcasts. Anotsu's quest is to gather other outcasts and form an extremely powerful new dojo, the Ittō-ryū  (a school teaching any technique that wins, no matter how exotic or underhanded), and has started taking over and destroying other dojos.

In addition, another group calling itself the Mugai-ryū has emerged, in opposition to the Ittō-ryū. Its true leadership and motives are initially a mystery, but its methods (any tactics that lead to victory) resemble those of the Ittō-ryū. They try to enlist Manji's help as they seem to want the same thing. Eventually, Manji joins but quickly pulls out after he finds out a member, Shira, is way too sadistic for his tastes. After a while, Manji finally discovers that the Mugai-ryū work for the government. They are all death row inmates who are allowed to live only if they serve the shogunate. While Manji and Shira quickly grow to hate each other, after Shira runs off, Manji remains on friendly terms with the other members of the group.

Creation and conception
Samura stated that Tange Sazen was the largest influence on his characters and narrative style. In regards to the overall work he stated that he wanted to create a new style of manga, with his intended style being "Don't obsess about the details--just look at the story."

Media

Manga

Blade of the Immortal, written and illustrated by Hiroaki Samura, began in Kodansha's seinen manga magazine Monthly Afternoon on June 25, 1993, and finished on December 25, 2012. Kodansha collected its 219 chapters into thirty tankōbon volumes, released from September 19, 1994, to February 22, 2013.

A sequel titled , written by Kenji Takigawa and illustrated by Ryū Suenobu, with Samura's collaboration, started in Monthly Afternoon on May 25, 2019. Kodansha released the first tankōbon volume on October 23, 2019. As of April 21, 2022, six volumes have been released.

Dark Horse Comics release

The English language version of the manga was published by Dark Horse Comics. The manga began its publication in individual monthly issues, with the first issue being published on June 1, 1996. These issues were later collected into individual volumes, and the first one was published on March 1, 1997. On October 11, 2007, Dark Horse Comics announced that they would drop the monthly issues publishing, with issue #131, released on November 14, 2007, being the last one. The series continued publishing through trade paperback volumes only, starting with the 18th volume, released on February 6, 2008. The 31st and last collected volume was published on April 1, 2015.

To preserve the integrity of his art, Samura requested the publisher Dark Horse Comics not to "flip" the manga, that is, reverse the pages as if in a mirror. At the time flipping was an almost universal practice for English-translated manga. Instead, Blade of the Immortal was modified for Western readers by the unusual method of cutting up the panels and rearranging them on the page in order to have the action flow from left to right. Another reason for not "flipping" the English version is Manji's clothing, which features a manji symbol, that if the pages were "flipped" would resemble specifically the Nazi swastika, instead of the ancient Eurasian swastika (that can be of any orientation), which for many cultures represents concepts such as peace and harmony.

Although American industry practice has largely changed over to publishing translated manga in its original right-to-left orientation, Blade of the Immortal had retained the labor-intensive cut-and-paste method. The publisher cautions that rearranging the panels is not foolproof, and can lead to continuity errors; this usually occurs when the flow of text bubbles is dependent upon character placement within panels. Some sound effects within the panel were retouched out and re-lettered in English. Japanese sound effects that are an integral part of the artwork were usually left as is. Additionally, some text bubbles or panel borders were redrawn, and script pacing subtly altered in order to understand the story or the placement of text bubbles.

In the monthly Dark Horse serialization, colored versions of title pages from the corresponding manga chapter were often featured as cover art, though in some cases a different piece of artwork, such as a tankōbon cover, were used as well. The original Japanese tankōbon volumes also collected more chapters than the English volumes published by Dark Horse, as such, they are longer and do not directly correspond to the English numbering scheme.

In July 2015, Dark Horse Comics announced an omnibus edition of Blade of the Immortal, each volume containing 3 original volumes, maintaining the left-to-right format. Ten volumes were released from December 28, 2016, to November 13, 2019. In March 2020, Dark Horse announced a deluxe re-release edition in hardcover and the first volume was released on October 7, 2020.

Anime

On March 23, 2008, it was announced that an animated television series adaptation of the manga would be directed by Kōichi Mashimo and produced by Bee Train in summer 2008. In North America, Media Blasters licensed the series and released it on September 29, 2009.

A second anime adaptation titled was listed on the cover of the July issue of Monthly Afternoon on May 10, 2019. It was later announced that the anime adaptation will be a complete adaptation. The series is animated by Liden Films and directed by Hiroshi Hamasaki, with Makoto Fukami handling series composition, Shingo Ogiso designing the characters, and Eiko Ishibashi composing the music. It aired from October 10, 2019, to March 25, 2020 on Amazon Prime Video. Kiyoharu performed the series' opening theme song "Survive of Vision". On October 15, 2020, Sentai Filmworks announced that they had licensed the anime for home video and released it on Blu-ray Disc on January 19, 2021.

Film

In 2017, the manga was adapted into a live action film, directed by Takashi Miike with the screenplay by Tetsuya Oishi and starring Takuya Kimura as Manji.

Reception
Blade of the Immortal won the Excellence Prize at the first Japan Media Arts Festival in 1997; and the Will Eisner Comic Industry Award in 2000 for Best U.S. Edition of Foreign Material. The manga had 5 million copies in print as of February 2017.

References

External links
 
 
Official 2008 anime website 
Official 2019 anime website 
Official 2008 anime blog 

2008 Japanese television series endings
2019 anime ONAs
Amazon Prime Video original programming
Anime and manga about revenge
Anime series based on manga
AT-X (TV network) original programming
Bee Train Production
Dark fantasy anime and manga
Dark Horse Comics titles
High fantasy anime and manga
Historical fantasy anime and manga
Japanese serial novels
Kodansha manga
Liden Films
Manga adapted into films
Manga adapted into television series
Media Blasters
Ninja in anime and manga
Production I.G
Samurai in anime and manga
Seinen manga
Sentai Filmworks